Kodok County is an administrative area in Fashoda State, South Sudan.

References

Counties of South Sudan